Berg Municipality is a municipality in Jämtland County in northern Sweden. Its seat is located in Svenstavik.

The present municipality was formed in 1971 when "old" Berg Municipality was amalgamated with four other entities.

As often in northern Sweden the municipality is one of the larger in terms of area, but one of the smaller in terms of population.

Geography 
The nature reserve Hoverberget lies within Berg Municipality, near Svenstavik. The high mountain Helags and Sweden's highest public road, over Flatruet, are located in the western end of Berg Municipality. Berg means mountain in Swedish, and the name of the municipality (and the Berg Parish) comes from Hoverberget.

Localities
There are six localities (or urban areas) in Berg Municipality:

The municipal seat in bold

Politics
Result of the 2010 election:
 Moderate Party 21,37% 	
 Centre party 17,54%
 Liberal People's Party 2,68%	
 Christian Democrats 2,57%	
 Swedish Social Democratic Party 39,44% 	
 Left Party 5,29%	
 Green Party 5,31%
 Sweden Democrats 4,65%
 Other Parties 1,16%

Notable people
 Georg Adlersparre (1760–1835), Swedish army commander, born in Hovermo now part of Berg Municipality.
 Thomas Wassberg, resident here (born elsewhere), Olympic Gold medalist.

See also
Kusbölehelvetet

References

External links

Berg Municipality Official site

Municipalities of Jämtland County